Loabeege Thoofan is a 1991 Maldivian drama film directed by Dhon Annaaru Rasheed. Produced by Hussain Rasheed under Farivaa Film, the film stars Reeko Moosa Manik, Athifa and Waleedha Waleed in pivotal roles.

Premise
Akram (Reeko Moosa Manik) joins a hospital as the chief surgeon where he meets a dedicated nurse, Naazleen (Athifa) who is dealing with the untimely death of her mother. The colleagues spend most of their time together and build a romantic relationship. He announces his plans of marriage in-front of his guardians which causes a ripple in the family since they are planning his marriage to their daughter, Saamiya (Waleedha Waleed).

Cast 
 Reeko Moosa Manik as Akram; chief surgeon
 Athifa as Naazlen; a nurse
 Waleedha Waleed as Saamiya
 Fathimath Didi
 Aminath
 Abdulla Saleem
 Soburee
 Asfaree
 Dhon Annaaru Ibrahim Rasheed
 Chilhiya Moosa Manik

Soundtrack

References

Maldivian drama films
1991 films
1991 drama films
Dhivehi-language films